KBR can stand for:
 KBR (company), formerly Kellogg, Brown & Root, US
 KBR (news agency), an Indonesian radio news agency
 KBR Park, Hyderabad, India
 Kafa language, spoken in Ethiopia
 Key-based routing in computer networking
 Potassium bromide (KBr)
 Royal Library of Belgium
 Sultan Ismail Petra Airport, IATA code